Byron Capers (born March 21, 1974) is a former American professional Canadian football defensive back who played in the Canadian Football League (CFL). He played college football at Florida State.

Early life and high school
Capers was born in Washington, D.C. and grew up primarily in Marietta, Georgia, where he attended Wheeler High School. As a senior, he was named first-team All-State and a second-team All-American by USA Today after making 117 tackles on defense and rushing for 1,305 yards on offense, as well as an All-American in track. Capers committed to play college football at Florida State University.

College career
Capers played four seasons for the Florida State Seminoles. As a freshman, he appeared mostly as a reserve safety and on special teams on the Seminoles 1993 national championship team. As a junior he was named second-team All-Atlantic Coast Conference. He was named first-team All-ACC in his senior season.

Capers also competed on Florida State's track team and earned All-America status as a junior in the 4x100 relay.

Professional career
Capers was selected in the seventh round of the 1997 NFL Draft by the Philadelphia Eagles but was cut at the end training camp. He was signed by the Kansas City Chiefs to their practice squad on November 13, 1997.

In 1998, Capers was signed by the Toronto Argonauts of the Canadian Football League (CFL). Capers played three and a half seasons in Toronto before being traded to the BC Lions in 2001. Capers was released by the Lions after three games and was signed by the Winnipeg Blue Bombers where finished the season, recording four interceptions in seven games played. He was released by the Blue Bombers in August of the following season and was picked up by the Ottawa Renegades for the final three games of the season. Capers started the 2003 season with the Renegades before being released and was signed later in the season by the Edmonton Eskimos, where he was a member of the Grey Cup championship team but did not play in any games. He was re-signed by the Renegades in 2004.

References

1974 births
Living people
Canadian football defensive backs
American players of Canadian football
American football defensive backs
Players of American football from Nevada
Ottawa Renegades players
Toronto Argonauts players
Sportspeople from Las Vegas
Florida State Seminoles football players
Edmonton Elks players
Philadelphia Eagles players
Kansas City Chiefs players
Florida State Seminoles men's track and field athletes